David Borradaile (born 16 September 1945) is a British former alpine skier who competed in the 1968 Winter Olympics.

References

External links
 

1945 births
Living people
British male alpine skiers
Olympic alpine skiers of Great Britain
Alpine skiers at the 1968 Winter Olympics